Karelichy (Korelitz) is a town in the Grodno Region of Belarus and the administrative centre of Karelichy District.

The town was historically a center of a large Jewish community; its population in 1900 was 1,840.

Notable people 

 Ignacy Domeyko (from Niedźwiadka village in Karelichy district)
 Itzhak Katzenelson
 Karelitz family, Avraham Yeshayahu Karelitz, Nissim Karelitz
 Saul Adler

See also 

 Mir Castle Complex
 Mir, Belarus

References

External links

 Photos on Radzima.org

 
Urban-type settlements in Belarus
Populated places in Grodno Region
Karelichy District
Nowogródek Voivodeship (1507–1795)
Novogrudsky Uyezd
Nowogródek Voivodeship (1919–1939)
Shtetls